Keith Bernard Clay (February 18, 1968 – March 20, 2003) and Shannon Charles Thomas (July 27, 1971 – November 16, 2005) were American murderers who killed a total of four people between December 1993 and January 1994. Thomas was convicted of the Christmas Eve, 1993 murders of 32-year-old Roberto Rios and his two children: 10-year-old Maria Rios and her 11-year-old brother, Victor Rios, in their Baytown, Texas home. Clay had also been present during the killings and confessed to attacking Roberto. Clay was convicted of the 1994 murder of a gas station clerk, during which Thomas was present. The killing occurred less than two weeks after the Rios family murders. Both were executed by lethal injection by the U.S. state of Texas, in 2003 and 2005, respectively.

Crimes 
Thomas and Clay's intention on Christmas Eve was to rob 32-year-old Roberto Rios, a small-time marijuana and cocaine dealer, of his drugs and money. In the early afternoon, Rios was duct taped to a chair, severely beaten, tortured with a pair of shears, shot twice in the head, and stabbed in the neck with a steak knife. Thomas then went upstairs to a bedroom where Rios's two children were: 10-year-old Maria Rios and her 11-year-old brother, Victor Rios. He shot them both point-blank in the head through a pillow as they lay on the floor. It appears that the motive for the killings of the children was the elimination of witnesses.

Police were unable to solve the crime for over a year until they arrested one of Thomas's friends who gave information that linked Thomas and Clay to the murders. Additionally, a postal worker and friend of the Rios's testified they had seen a "beige-looking, maybe white" car in front of the house. Clay owned a white Cadillac CTS4 with tinted windows which he reported stolen after the murders.

Trials and appeals 

During Thomas's trial, it was revealed that he had also taken part in a robbery on January 4, 1994, where Keith Clay shot Melathethil Tom Varughese, a clerk at a Texaco gas station.

Thomas had previous criminal convictions to his name. He was on probation for delivery of a controlled substance and had served time in a Harris County, Texas boot camp for assault.

After being convicted of the two children's murders, Thomas was sentenced to death by a jury on November 8, 1996. The conviction and sentence were then affirmed by the Texas Court of Criminal Appeals after an automatic appeal required in all death penalty cases in Texas. An appeal for writ of habeas corpus was denied on November 24, 1998, by the Court of Criminal Appeals. Appeals to a U.S. district court were also denied and an application for a certificate of appealability was denied in the United States Court of Appeals for the Fifth Circuit on October 11, 2004. Thomas did not file a clemency petition with the Texas Board of Pardons and Paroles.

Thomas' defense claimed that although the postal worker said that he saw two men at the Rios' home on the day of the murders, it was only under hypnosis that he identified Thomas as one of those men. Thomas continued to contend that he was completely innocent of the murders and that evidence against him was purely circumstantial.

Shannon Charles Thomas, Texas Department of Criminal Justice (TDCJ) Death Row#999213, was received by the TDCJ on December 4, 1996. He was held in the death row in the Ellis Unit until 1999, when the death row moved to the Polunsky Unit.

Executions 

Clay was executed on March 20, 2003, for the murder of Melathethil Tom Varughese.

Thomas was executed on November 16, 2005. No member of the Rios' family witnessed the execution. Thomas requested that his sister and a friend witness for him. Thomas requested no last meal.

In his final statement, Thomas said:
 "Yes. Man, I just want you to know how much I love them. I want you to be strong and get through this time. Do not fall back. Keep going forward. Don't let this hinder you. Let everybody know I love them (several names listed), Kevin - as well as everyone else in the family. Tell them that I love them and stay strong. This is kind of hard to put words together; I am nervous and it is hard to put my thoughts together. Sometimes you don't know what to say; I hope these words give you comfort. I don't know what to say. I want you to know I love you; just stay strong and don't give up. Let everybody know I love them…and love is unconditional, as Mama has always told us. I may be gone in the flesh, but I am always with you in spirit. I love you."

As the drugs started taking effect, Thomas asked, "Is the mic still on?" He was told that it was, but then he lost consciousness.

His execution was delayed shortly by a late appeal that was denied by the Supreme Court of the United States. He was pronounced dead at 6:52 p.m. CST after being executed by lethal injection at the Huntsville Unit, Huntsville, Texas.

It was the 996th execution in the United States since the Gregg v. Georgia decision in 1976.

See also 

 Capital punishment in Texas
 Capital punishment in the United States
 List of people executed in Texas, 2000–2009
 List of people executed in the United States in 2003
 List of people executed in the United States in 2005

References

External links 
 Media Advisory from the Texas Attorney General
 Report from National Coalition to Abolish the Death Penalty
 Offender Information from Texas Department of Criminal Justice
 Offender Information from Texas Department of Criminal Justice
 Last Statement from Texas Department of Criminal Justice
 Keith Bernard Clay from The Clark County Prosecuting Attorney.
 Shannon Charles Thomas from The Clark County Prosecuting Attorney.
 
 
 

1968 births
1971 births
2003 deaths
2005 deaths
American people convicted of murder
People executed for murder
21st-century executions by Texas
People from Houston
People executed by Texas by lethal injection
American murderers of children
People convicted of murder by Texas
Executed African-American people
21st-century executions of American people
21st-century African-American people
Criminal duos